Walking on Dead Fish (earlier full name Hurricane Season: Walking on Dead Fish) is a 2008 independent film by first-time American director, producer, and writer Franklin Martin. It is a heartfelt documentary about a small town high school football team and its "displaced players" who are thrown together by the powerful winds and floods of Hurricane Katrina. It is executive produced by Franklin Martin, Stan Cassio, and Terry Bradshaw; who also narrates the documentary.

Synopsis 
Walking on Dead Fish tells the story of the East St. John Wildcats, a small-town high school football team that looks within to brave the adversity delivered by Hurricane Katrina.

Its under-funded high school, East St. John High School, took in 450 displaced students and 20 of them joined the football team. With their first two games already cancelled, the Wildcats and their 20 new teammates, some from rival schools, take the field against rival Hahnville despite being short on equipment and practice time and wearing both home and away jerseys.

This group of teenage boys, blown together by the winds of Katrina, decide to make the best of their situation overcome the tragedy of losing their homes and schools. Despite vastly different social, economic, and racial backgrounds, they unite to overcome the tragedy that they all have in common, and quickly begin winning games.

The films explores the recovery from the worst natural disaster in our country's history through the eyes of a group of 16-year-old boys forced to quickly become men. In doing so, they unite a devastated school and lift the spirit of a broken community. More than football and more than Katrina, Walking on Dead Fish is a testament to the will of young men who put “we” before “me”.

Release 
The film was released theatrically on September 19, 2008, by Variance Films and Dutchmen Films.  The film debuted in New Orleans, taking in over $11,000 in one theater in its first weekend, the #3 per screen average in the country.  The film is currently in a rolling release throughout the Southern United States.  A national release has not been announced.

External links 
 
  Sports Illustrated Article
 

2008 films
2008 independent films
Documentary films about Hurricane Katrina
Documentary films about American football
American sports documentary films
High school football films
Variance Films films
2000s high school films
2008 directorial debut films
Films shot in Louisiana
Films set in Louisiana
High school football in Louisiana
2000s English-language films
2000s American films